Eliezer Smoli (1901–1985) was an Israeli writer known for his children's books.

Biography 

Eliezer Smoli was born in the Volhynia region of western Ukraine (then in the Russian Empire). He began writing at the age of ten, After immigrating to  British-ruled Palestine in 1920, he founded a labor movement school for workers' children in Nesher.

From 1936 to 1942, Smoli studied natural sciences at Berlin University.

Awards and recognition
 In 1957, Smoli was awarded the Israel Prize for Children's literature.

References

See also 
List of Israel Prize recipients

Israel Prize in children's literature recipients
Humboldt University of Berlin alumni
Soviet emigrants to Mandatory Palestine
Jews from the Russian Empire
Jews in Mandatory Palestine
20th-century Israeli Jews
Israeli children's writers
1901 births
1985 deaths